The Lechincioara is a right tributary of the river Valea Rea in Romania. It discharges into the Valea Rea in Boinești. The lower course of the Valea Rea is also considered the lower course of the Lechincioara.

References

Rivers of Romania
Rivers of Satu Mare County